John Walter Evans (22 February 1919 – 24 November 1988) was Archdeacon of Malta from 1975 to 1978.

Evans was born in 1919 and studied at Durham University as a member of St Chad's College, completing his Bachelor of Arts degree in 1941. After theological studies at Ripon College Cuddesdon, he was ordained in 1942.

After a curacy at Roath he became Chaplain of Barnard Castle School. He was Vicar of Hammersmith from 1965 to 1975.

In retirement, Evans lived in Huntington, Cheshire. He died there on 24 November 1988, at the age of 69.

Notes

1919 births
1988 deaths
20th-century Maltese Anglican priests
Alumni of Ripon College Cuddesdon
Alumni of St Chad's College, Durham
Archdeacons of Malta
Royal Navy chaplains